Pittsville is an unincorporated community in Jackson Township, Johnson County, in the U.S. state of Missouri.

History
Pittsville was platted in 1858, and named after Warren M. Pitts, a local minister. A post office called Pittsville was established in 1860, and remained in operation until 1954.

References

Unincorporated communities in Johnson County, Missouri
Unincorporated communities in Missouri